Dorcadion arenarium is a species of beetle in the family Cerambycidae. It was described by Scopoli in 1763. It is known from Italy, Albania, Austria, France, Croatia, Bosnia and Herzegovina, Slovenia, and Montenegro.

Subspecies
 Dorcadion arenarium abruptum Germar, 1839
 Dorcadion arenarium arenarium (Scopoli, 1763)
 Dorcadion arenarium rubripes Müller, 1905
 Dorcadion arenarium skypetarum Heyrovský, 1937
 Dorcadion arenarium subcarinatum Müller, 1905

References

arenarium
Beetles described in 1763
Taxa named by Giovanni Antonio Scopoli